Agabekov or Aghabekov is a surname. Notable people with the surname include:

 Georges Agabekov (1896–1937), Armenian Soviet spy and defector
 Sadykh bey Aghabekov (1865–1944), Azerbaijani general and politician